Student Tour is a 1934 American musical film directed by Charles Reisner, written by Ralph Spence and Philip Dunne, and starring Jimmy Durante, Charles Butterworth, Maxine Doyle, Phil Regan, Douglas Fowley and Nelson Eddy. It was released on October 5, 1934, by Metro-Goldwyn-Mayer.

Plot

Cast 
Jimmy Durante as Hank Merman 
Charles Butterworth as Ethelred Lippincott 
Maxine Doyle as Ann Lippincott 
Phil Regan as Bobby Kane 
Douglas Fowley as Mushy 
Nelson Eddy as himself
Florine McKinney as Lilith Lorraine
Monte Blue as Jeff Kane
Betty Grable as Cayenne (uncredited)
Dewey Robinson as Huan Lu
Bruce Bennett as Hercules (uncredited)
Mischa Auer as Sikh Cop (uncredited)
Arthur Treacher as Race announcer (uncredited)
Dick Foran as Assistant Manager (uncredited)
Herbert Prior as Grouch (uncredited)

References

External links 
 

1934 films
American musical films
1934 musical films
Metro-Goldwyn-Mayer films
Films directed by Charles Reisner
Films with screenplays by Philip Dunne
American black-and-white films
1930s English-language films
1930s American films